SoundRenderer is a spatialized audio rendering plugin for Maya to simulate 3D-positional audio. It can be used to create a multichannel audiotrack from many mono wav-files positioned in the scene for later synchronization with the rendered video.

The plugin uses the audiofiles set up in the 3d scene and renders them to a variable number of channels (mono, stereo, 5.1 etc.). To simulate a realistic surrounding, it uses several realworld effects:

 distance-delay
 doppler-effect
 air-absorption
 panning

Nodes

There are two different kinds of nodes available. The speaker nodes can be linked to wav-files which are triggered either by a keyframe or an expression, but can also be looped (for constant environmental sounds). The listener node can contain a variable number of speakers and offers a customization of the different effects and their precision.

Mixer

The mixer offers a parallel configuration of the Speakers in the scene without having to find and select them. It also allows to change the triggering mode.

See also

3D audio effect
Maya (software)
List of Maya plugins

References

External links
 SoundRenderer download page
 Multimedia and Data Software Solutions

Multimedia software